Red rattlesnake may refer to:

 Crotalus ruber, a.k.a. the red diamond rattlesnake, a venomous pitviper species found in southwestern California in the United States and Baja California in Mexico
 Crotalus pyrrhus, a.k.a. the Southwestern speckled rattlesnake, a venomous pitviper species found in the southwestern United States

Animal common name disambiguation pages